Bird Paradise is an upcoming aviary located in Mandai, Singapore. Expected to open in Q2 2023, it will replace the Jurong Bird Park and forms a part of the Mandai Wildlife Reserve, consisting of the Singapore Zoo, Night Safari and River Wonders and the upcoming Rainforest Wild Park. Bird Paradise will cover 17 hectares, smaller than the previous Jurong Bird Park.

History 
In 2016, the Mandai Wildlife Group announced that the Jurong Bird Park would be relocated to a much larger park at Mandai Lake Road by 2020, consolidating with the three existing wildlife parks together with a new Rainforest Wild Park to form an integrated nature and wildlife precinct known as the Mandai Wildlife Reserve. In 2021, the group announced that the park's successor in Mandai would be named Bird Paradise. In 2022, it was announced that Jurong Bird Park will close on 3 January 2023 to finalise its move to Bird Paradise at Mandai.

See also 
 Jurong Bird Park

References 

Tourist attractions in Singapore
Aviaries
Mandai
Bird parks